Jutta of Saxony (c. 1223 – before 2 February 1267) was Queen of Denmark as the wife of King Eric IV of Denmark. She was the daughter of Albert I, Duke of Saxony. She married king Erik in 1239, and became junior queen consort, since her husband was junior king, even though there were no senior queen at the time. She would become senior queen in 1242.

Not many details are known about Queen Jutta. Jutta was involved in a conflict with the monks of Øm Abbey, from whom she confiscated corn from their estates and shipped it to her own. Her signature was also on the instruction regarding the funeral service of her spouse, in which he expressed the wish to be buried in the clothes of a monk. She was queen for eight years and widowed in 1250 when her spouse was murdered. She is believed to have returned to Saxony as a widow, leaving her daughters in Denmark.

Jutta married a second time and became the first wife of Count Burchard VIII of Querfurt-Rosenburg, who held function and title of Burgrave of Magdeburg (recorded between 1273 and 1313), a son of Burgrave Burchard VI (recorded between 1221 and 1273).

Her children with Eric IV were:

Sophia of Denmark, (1241–1286) married to King Valdemar of Sweden
Canute (Knud) of Denmark (b. & d. 1242)
Ingeborg of Denmark (1244–1287), married to King Magnus VI of Norway
Jutta of Denmark, prioress of St. Agnes' Priory, Roskilde (1246–1284)
Christof of Denmark (b. & d. 1247)
Agnes of Denmark, prioress of St. Agnes' Priory, Roskilde (1249–1288/95)

Her daughter with Burchard VIII was:

Sophia Burghardsdatter von Querfurt-Rosenburg (d. 1325), married with Erik Erikssøn Langben (1272–1310), Duke of Langeland, son of Eric I, Duke of Schleswig

References
 Alf Henrikson: Dansk historia (Danish history) (1989) (Swedish)
 Sven Rosborn (In Swedish): När hände vad i Nordens historia (When did what happen in the history of the Nordic countries) (1997)
 Dansk biografisk Lexikon / VIII. Bind. Holst - Juul (in Danish)

Notes

|-

Danish royal consorts
House of Ascania
Place of birth unknown
Place of death unknown
13th-century Danish people
13th-century Danish women
1220s births
Year of birth uncertain
13th-century deaths
Remarried royal consorts
Daughters of monarchs